St Denys Church may refer to:
 St Denys Anglican Church, Queensland, Australia
Church of St Denys, Colmworth, Bedfordshire, England
 St Denys' Church, Little Barford, Bedfordshire, England
Church of St Denys, Lisvane, Cardiff, Wales
 St Denys' Church, Sleaford, Lincolnshire, England
St Denys' Church, Warminster, Wiltshire, England
 St Denys's Church, York, England

See also 
 Saint Denis (disambiguation)
 St. Denis' Church (disambiguation)
 St. Denys Priory, Hampshire, England
 St. Denys Theological Institute, Paris
Community of St. Denys, England